Dicopus is a wasp genus in the family Mymaridae. About 15 species have been described in the genus.

References

External links 
 NHM database

Mymaridae